Crewe-by-Farndon is a settlement and former civil parish, now in the parish of Farndon, in the borough of Cheshire West and Chester and ceremonial county of Cheshire in England. In 2001 it had a population of around 45. The civil parish was abolished in 2015 and merged into Farndon.

There is a small Methodist Chapel, founded in 1858, located on Crewe Lane South. This was originally Primitive Methodist but is now part of the South Cheshire Circuit and the local Cheshire Hills Mission Area.

The parish contained one listed building, Crewe Hill, which is designed at Grade II.  This grade is the lowest of the three gradings given to listed buildings and is applied to "buildings of national importance and special interest".

References

External links

 Crewe-by-Farndon Methodist Chapel

Villages in Cheshire
Former civil parishes in Cheshire
Cheshire West and Chester